Theodore Migdal Jr. (February 14, 1918 – November 1, 1999) was an American professional basketball player. He played for the Akron Firestone Non-Skids in the National Basketball League during 1938–39, averaged 9.0 points per game, and won the NBL championship.

References

1918 births
1999 deaths
Akron Firestone Non-Skids players
American men's basketball players
Basketball players from Illinois
Basketball players from Akron, Ohio
Forwards (basketball)
Miami RedHawks football players
Miami RedHawks men's basketball players
Sportspeople from Joliet, Illinois